Dénis Paulo Duarte (born 4 May 1994) is a Portuguese professional footballer who plays as a central defender for Vitória S.C. B.

Club career
Born in the village of Marteleira in Lourinhã, Lisbon District, Duarte spent his youth at S.C. Lourinhanense and S.C.U. Torreense before making his senior debut for the latter in the third division. At the end of 2014, he signed a 3-year deal with Vitória S.C. of the Primeira Liga.

Duarte made his professional debut with the reserve team on 25 January 2015, coming on as a 61st-minute substitute for Xande Silva in a 2–1 away win against C.D. Feirense in the Segunda Liga. In the 2015–16 season he scored a career-best 11 goals – mostly from penalties – adding nine the following with the side always in that tier.

On 14 October 2017, Duarte appeared in his first competitive match with the first team, scoring in the 6–1 away victory over amateurs CF Vasco da Gama in the third round of the Taça de Portugal. His top-flight debut took place on 24 February 2018, in a 2–3 loss at C.S. Marítimo where he also played the full 90 minutes.

Duarte joined FC Dynamo Brest of the Belarusian Premier League on 19 June 2018. While in Eastern Europe he won the league in 2019, but injury ruled him out the following season and he rescinded his contract on 29 May 2020, that was due to last until the end of the year.

On 7 September 2020, Duarte returned to his homeland's division two on a one-year deal at F.C. Penafiel.

References

External links

Portuguese League profile 

1994 births
Living people
Sportspeople from Lisbon District
Portuguese footballers
Association football defenders
Primeira Liga players
Liga Portugal 2 players
Segunda Divisão players
S.C.U. Torreense players
Vitória S.C. B players
Vitória S.C. players
F.C. Penafiel players
Belarusian Premier League players
FC Dynamo Brest players
Russian First League players
FC Tom Tomsk players
Portuguese expatriate footballers
Expatriate footballers in Belarus
Expatriate footballers in Russia
Portuguese expatriate sportspeople in Russia